SlickLogin was an Israeli start-up company that developed sound-based password alternatives. The company's goal was to enable end users to log in easily to password-protected websites by using a uniquely generated sound.

The company was founded by Or Zelig, who served as the firm's CEO, Eran Galili, CTO, and Ori Kabeli, VP of R&D. They were recent graduates of the IDF's elite cyber-security unit and spent over six years working on information security projects.

In February 2014, Google announced the acquisition of the company.

SlickLogin used various protocols to start verifying your phone's position: WiFi, Bluetooth, NFC, visual markers like QR codes, and of course, GPS. Their self-dubbed "secret sauce", though, was their use of uniquely generated sounds intentionally made inaudible to the human ear. The user's computer played the sound through speakers, while a mobile app used the device's built-in microphone to pick up the audio, analyze it, and send the signal to the site's server for authentication.

See also
 SilverPush

References

External links
Official Website

Google acquisitions
Software companies of Israel
Information technology companies of Israel
Companies based in Tel Aviv